Peers School may refer to:

 Gakushuin University, higher educational institution in Tokyo
 Oxford Academy (United Kingdom), formerly Peers School, a co-educational state secondary school in Oxford